Paul Baker (born 1972) is a British professor and linguist at the Department of Linguistics and English Language of Lancaster University, United Kingdom. His research focuses on corpus linguistics, critical discourse analysis, corpus-assisted discourse studies and language and identity. He is renowned for his research on the language of Polari. He is a Fellow of the Academy of Social Sciences and a Fellow of the Royal Society for Arts.

Career 
On 8 November 2003, Scott Simon interviewed Baker on the language of Polari on the National Public Radio.

Since its creation in 2006, Baker has been the commissioning editor of the journal Corpora.

On 24 May 2010, Baker's article, Polari, a vibrant language born out of prejudice, was published in The Guardian on the language of Polari. Baker said that "I love Polari, but hopefully, the narrow-minded social conditions that led to its creation will never require anything like it to happen in this country again."

In an article, published on 27 July 2017 on BBC, Paul Baker said that "Layering upon layering of different influences ensures that there is no one single version of Polari but many versions and Polari has its own vocabulary for elements that mainstream society is not interested in."

On 6 November 2017 Baker was accepted as a Fellow of the Royal Society for the encouragement of Arts, Manufactures and Commerce (RSA).

In 2018 he received a staff award for work on the language of Polari and its contribution to uncovering and highlighting LGBT heritage.

In July 2019 he gave a speech about bias in the press at the British Parliament at the launch of the Centre for Media Monitoring.

Research
His PhD thesis was published in a book entitled Polari - The Lost Language of Gay Men (2002). A later book, Fabulosa (2019) updated the research for a non-academic audience. Baker regularly runs workshops in Polari at the Bishopsgate Institute, London.

His research focuses on corpus linguistics, language and identity, and critical discourse analysis.

A Polari exhibition at the John Rylands Library, Manchester used Paul Baker's research. The Polari Mission was a multi-disciplinary collaboration between artists and specialists in the fields of linguistics and computer science including Baker and Tim Greening-Jackson. The aim was to raise awareness about Polari, one of the world’s most endangered languages, a bold yet secretive part of Gay history.

In 2017 Baker's research on change in British and American English was reported in the Telegraph, Guardian and Mail. Baker noted how gradable adverbs like quite, rather and fairly have dramatically decreased in British English over the period 1931-2006, a phenomenon which seems to follow American English, which is more advanced.

In 2019, Baker's research on patient feedback on the National Health Service was reported in the Mail, Independent and Metro.

Publications
Baker has published over 30 articles in journals such as Discourse and Society, Journal of English Linguistics, Language Learning and Technology, Journal of Language and Politics, and Applied Linguistics. These include:

Baker, P. (2016) 'The shapes of collocation.' International Journal of Corpus Linguistics 21(2): 139-164.

Baker, P.,Gabrielatos, C., Khosravinik, M., Krzyzanowski, M., McEnery, T and Wodak, R. (2008) 'A useful methodological synergy? Combining critical discourse analysis and corpus linguistics to examine discourses of refugees and asylum seekers in the UK press.' Discourse and Society 19(3): 273-306.

Gabrielatos, C. and Baker, P. (2008) 'Fleeing, sneaking, flooding: a corpus analysis of discursive constructions of refugees and asylum seekers in the UK Press 1996-2005)' Journal of English Linguistics 36:1 pp. 5–38.

Baker, P. (2004) 'Querying keywords: questions of difference, frequency and sense in keywords analysis.' Journal of English Linguistics. 32: 4 pp 346–359.

Bibliography

Books
Baker, P. (2002). Polari: The Lost Language of Gay Men. London: Routledge
Baker, P. (2002) Fantabulosa: A Dictionary of Polari and Gay Slang. London: Continuum
Baker, P. & Stanley, J. (2003) Hello Sailor! Seafaring life for gay men: 1945-1990. London: Pearson.
Baker, P. (2005). Public discourses of gay men
Baker, P., Hardie, A. & McEnery, A. (2006) A Glossary of Corpus Linguistics. Edinburgh: Edinburgh University Press.
Baker, P. (2006) Using Corpora in Discourse Analysis. London: Continuum.
Baker, P. (2008) Sexed Texts: Language, Gender and Sexuality. London: Equinox.
Baker, P. (ed.) (2009) Contemporary Corpus Linguistics. London: Continuum.
Baker, P. (2010) Sociolinguistics and Corpus Linguistics. Edinburgh: Edinburgh University Press. 
Baker, P. and Ellece, S. (2011) Key Terms in Discourse Analysis. London: Continuum.
Baker, P. Gabrielatos, C. and McEnery. T. (2013) Discourse Analysis and Media Attitudes: The Representation of Islam in the British Press. Cambridge: Cambridge University Press.
Baker, P. (2014) Using Corpora to Analyse Gender. London: Bloomsbury.
Baker, P. and McEnery, T. (eds) (2015) Corpora and Discourse: Integrating Discourse and Corpora. London: Palgrave.
Baker, P. and Egbert, J. (eds) (2016) Triangulating Methodological Approaches in Corpus-Linguistic Research. London: Routledge.
Baker, P. and Balirano, G. (eds) (2017) Queering Masculinities in Language and Culture. London: Palgrave.
Baker, P. (2017) American and British English. Divided by a Common Language? Cambridge: Cambridge University Press.
Baker, P., Brookes, G. and Evans, C. (2019) The Language of Patient Feedback: A corpus linguistic study of online health communication. London: Routledge.
Baker, P. (2019) Fabulosa! The Story of Polari, Britain's Secret Gay Language. London: Reaktion.
Egbert, J. and Baker, P. (eds) (2019) Triangulating Corpus Methodological Approaches in Linguistic Research. London: Routledge.
Baker, P. Vessey, R. and McEnery, T. (2021) The Language of Violent Jihad. Cambridge: Cambridge University Press.
Brookes, G. and Baker, P. (2021) Obesity in the News: Language and Representation in the Press. Cambridge: Cambridge University Press.
Baker, P. (2022) Outrageous! The Story of Section 28 and Britain's Battle for LGBT Education. London: Reaktion.

Articles
Baker, P., Gabrielatos, C., Khosravinik, M., Krzyżanowski, M., McEnery T., & Wodak, R. (2008). A useful methodological synergy? Combining critical discourse analysis and corpus linguistics to examine discourses of refugees and asylum seekers in the UK press. Discourse and Society, 19(3). doi:
Gabrielatos, C., & Baker, P. (2008). Fleeing, sneaking, flooding. Journal of English Linguistics, 36(1). doi:

References

External links 
 

1972 births
Living people
Applied linguists
Linguists from the United Kingdom
Department of Linguistics and English Language, Lancaster University
British gay writers
Alumni of Lancaster University